A vishapakar also known as vishap stones, vishap stelae, "serpent-stones", "dragon stones", are characteristic monoliths found in large numbers in the Armenian Highlands, in natural and artificial ponds, and other sources of water. They are commonly carved from one piece of stone, into cigar-like shapes with fish heads or serpents. Supposedly they are images of vishaps, a water dragon of Armenian folklore.
There are about 150 known extant vishap stelae, of which 90 are found in Armenia.

Location 
Found in Armenia's Gegham mountains, Lake Sevan's north-east coast, Mount Aragats's slopes, Garni, the valley of Çoruh River, as well as other places, where they used to worship  Vishap stones in ancient times. They are obvious with "Vishap" names. They were carved from massive stones (the biggest being 5.06m high), in a fish form, with a snake, bull, ram, stork, etc, as well as bird sculptures, usually placed in fountains, canals, reservoirs, and artificial lakes nearby. It can be assumed that these slabs were supporting agriculture and irrigation, by worshipping personal water deities.

Discovery and research 
Vishaps were introduced by the Armenian writer Atrpet in 1880. His work was published in 1926. In 1909, when Nicholas Marr and Yakov Smirnov's visited Armenia's Temple of Garni for a paleontological excavation, the local residents heard stories about the Vishaps that lived in the tall mountains. Scientists organized the expedition, climbed the Gegham mountains, to confirm the existence Vishaps and whether they have any scientific significance or not. The findings in the Gegham mountains were published in 1931.

The scientists in the mountains discovered megalithic stone sculptures, which the Armenians called "Vishap",  and were mostly in the form of a fish. The biggest Vishap measured 4.75m high, and 55cm wide. In 1909, all the Vishaps were destroyed, and a part of them were buried in the soil.

Soon, other expeditions that were organized on the Gegham mountains found more Vishaps. In 1910, Nicholas Marr and Yakov Smirnov had already found 27 similar megalithic sculptures. There were similar Vishaps discovered in Armenia's Lake Sevan, southern Georgia, and modern day eastern Turkey (historical Western Armenia).

Date 
Determining how old Vishaps are is particularly difficult. The monuments are placed away from neighborhoods, whose radiocarbon analysis of the organic residues would enable them to determine the approximate age.

On the giant Yurt's premiere Vishap that was found, there was images of the cross and Armenian letters dated from the 13th century. The position of the cross and the writings show that in the 13th century, the Vishap was still in the upright position. In 1963, in the Garni area a Vishap was excavated, which had an inscripition of  Argishti I of Urartu (8th century BC).

Comparison has been made with the megaliths found in the North Caucasus and Europe. There are also similarities with monuments found in northern Mongolia.

Typology 

All the findings are carved on one stone, that is within 3-5m high. Most of the Vishaps are in a fish form that resembles a catfish. Basically, the carved details represent the fish eyes, mouth, tail, and gills. Another portion of the Vishaps are pictured as a hoofed animal such as a bull or ram and may represent a sacrifice, with various cases only pictured as stakes on the stretched animal skin. On other Vishaps, there are waves symbolizing water, which often come out of the mouth of the bull, long-legged birds, and rare snakes.

Three Main Types of Vishaps:
 Bull form (square, thick plate form, the front is mainly a bull's head and fallen down limbs image)
 Fish form (oval, carved in the shape of the fish, contains features unique to the fish anatomy) 
 Fish-Bull Form (contains both of the forms)

Most of the Vishap stones are found fallen down in a horizontal position, lying down. However, the three forms listed above are designed and carved on all sides. The tails of the fish forms of the Vishap stones suggests that they were also once in a standing position.

The Vishaps are monuments used to worship water, which are believed to have a close tie to water distribution. Almost all the Vishaps are found in places related to mountain springs or canals. Similarly, there are irrigation systems found by Ashkharbek Kalantar at Mount Aragats, the Tokhmakagan backwaters of the Gegham mountains, Artanish Bay and near Gemerzek settlements. Although it is impossible to precisely date the irrigation systems, scientists have linked the Vishaps to ancient fertility and water worship.

Gallery

Vishap serpent 

The prominent characteristics of the "Vishap" are that they come from the "water" and they are "poisonous"; Thus, they are described as "water dragons with poisonous saliva". The name might derive from an ancient Iranian term vi-šāpa, 'having poisonous juices', used in reference to snakes.

Certain studies believe Vishap is foremost worshipped as water, rain and a rich-giving soul, whose tail is capable of creating canals and paths when it hits the Earth. Vishap is also seen as an eerie monster who is a water source and guards treasure. Almost all the mythology explains divinity or god's hand as the cause of Vishap's death, which absorbed the water, the treasures that were guarded, and released the sacrificial virgins. Thus, old Egyptian myth regards Vishap as a power of darkness, who is defeated by the sun goddess Rán. As for Armenian myth, Vahagn, the dragon slayer, fights and wins the battle against Vishap. The Vishap battle myths have spread across the Armenian population as an old folk tale (for example, Dikran and Aztahag, Daredevils of Sassoun). They have also had an influence in Christian literature. According to legend, Vishap's death and virgin sacrifice saves Saint George. Other legend says Vishap is presented as a Sun, who is a bad and destructive force, that the angels fight with (thunder as a symbol of the fight, the lightning as Archangel Gabriel's flashing sword, the sparks as a fiery arrow, and the rainbow as the bow).

According to Manuk Abeghian, Vishaps have been donated to Pantheon's beloved goddess, Astghik. As for Grigor Ghapantsyan, they symbolize the dying and resurrecting god, Ara the Beautiful.

See also

Obelisk
Cromlêh
Azhdahak
Khachkar
Dolmen
Menhir
Stele

References

External links
The Vishap Stones, Project Discovery! Newsletter, 2006
The Vishap Stelae, Ed.  Armen Petrosyan, Arsen Bobokhyan, Yerevan, 2015
 Ранние образы рыбы, вишапа, дракона и змеи в армянском наскальном искусстве 
 Հատված Նոնա Ստեփանյանի « Հայաստանի արվեստը » գրքից

Literature 
 Пиотровский Б.Б. Вишапы. Каменные статуи в горах Армении, Издание Армянского филиала АН СССР, Ленинград, 1939 
 Аракелян Б.Н., Арутюнян Н.В. Находка урартской надписи в Гарни // Историко-филологический журнал Армянской ССР, № 2, 1966 
 Марр Н.Я., Смирнов Я.И. Вишапы // Труды Государственной Академии Истории Материальной Культуры, т. I, Ленинград, 1931 
 Мещанинов И.И. Каменные статуи рыб - вишапы на Кавказе и в Северной Монголии // Записки Коллегии Востоковедов, I, Ленинград, 1926 
 Мифологический словарь/ Гл. ред. Е. М. Мелетинский. — М.:Советская энциклопедия, 1990. — 672 с. 
 Абегян М. Армянский эпический фольклор, Труды, т. I. Ер., 1966. с. 85-86, на арм. яз. 
 Վիշապ քարակոթողները, Խմբ. Ա. Պետրոսյան, Ա. Բոբոխյան, Գիտություն, Երևան, 2015, 420 էջ

Stones
Megalithic monuments
Armenian art